A Shabbat pedestrian crossing or hands-free pedestrian crossing is an automatically controlled device which allows Orthodox Jews to use pedestrian crossings on Shabbat. The first such crossing is to be installed in the north London suburb of Finchley.

The need for such a device arises for Jews who observe Sabbath laws and are prohibited from operating electrical machinery. Instead of having to press an electric button to operate the crossing system, every 90 seconds, traffic lights will automatically turn red giving a chance for pedestrians to cross.

Similar arrangements also occur in other places.  In Highland Park, New Jersey, pedestrian crossing lights cycle automatically on the Sabbath, though they are operated by buttons during the week.

See also
 Electricity on Shabbat in Jewish law
 Shabbat elevator
 Shabbat microphone

References

Pedestrian crossings
Shabbat innovations